Admiral Meade may refer to:

Richard Meade, 4th Earl of Clanwilliam (1832–1907), British Royal Navy admiral
Richard Worsam Meade III (1837–1897), U.S. Navy rear admiral

See also
Jonathan Mead (born 1964), Royal Australian Navy vice admiral
Herbert Meade-Fetherstonhaugh (1875–1964), British Royal Navy admiral